Richard Adams (born February 13, 1948), known as Dick or Dickie, was a gridiron football defensive back who was drafted and tried out for the Houston Oilers of the National Football League, and later played for the Ottawa Rough Riders of the Canadian Football League.  Adams was released at the end of the first week of the Oilers' 1971 training camp before the first preseason game.

After being signed by the Rough Riders, Adams played in 63 regular season games from 1972 to 1976. He was named an All-Canadian player from 1972 to 1975. Adams became a Grey Cup champion in 1973 after the Rough Riders defeated the Edmonton Eskimos 22–18 in the 61st Grey Cup. He also won another Grey Cup with Ottawa in 1976.

College career

Dick Adams was a three-year letterwinner (1968–70) at Miami.  He was selected first-team all-MAC defensive back and kick returner in 1969 and 1970, where he also punted and occasionally lined up as a receiver on offense.  He still owns a part of three school records for interceptions in a season (7 - twice) and punt returns in a game (12) and season (55) . In his college playing career he established 14 records and tied two others, including four Mid-American Conference marks. Adams set national records for punt returns (55) and total kick returns (70).

In both 1969 and 1970 Dick Adams won the Miami most valuable player award. In 1970 Adams had his best year at Miami.  Adams was selected as a second-team All-American by the Associated Press. He also was named MAC Defensive Player of the Year.  Adams and Jim Bengala were both named the team captains.

Dick Adams was elected to the Miami Athletic Hall of Fame in 2004.

Coaching career

Adams began his coaching career in 1976 at Carleton University in Ottawa, Ontario, Canada. He went on to coach at four other colleges over the next 19 years. He made his professional coaching debut as an assistant coach and special teams coordinator in 1983 with the Calgary Stampede of the Canadian Football League.

The highlight of Adams CFL coaching career came in 1989 as an assistant coach with the Saskatchewan Roughriders. The Roughriders won the western conference and Grey Cup that season. He has also spent a number of years with Winnipeg and Ottawa in the CFL as well.

Adams served as head coach of Bethel College (93-95) and was an assistant at Murray State (92-93).

Adams made his indoor coaching debut in 1998 with the Madison Mad Dogs (PIFL). He led Madison to the championship game and was named PIFL Co-Coach of the Year that season. Adams was also an assistant coach for the Peoria Pirates (AF2) when the team won the championship in 2002 and also coached briefly with the New York Dragons (AFL) that year. In 2004 he was named head coach to the Tennessee Valley Pythons during their inaugural 2005 United Indoor Football season. In 2005 Adams agreed to become the next head coach of the La Crosse Night Train of the National Indoor Football League.

References 

1948 births
American football defensive backs
Canadian football defensive backs
Miami RedHawks football players
Houston Oilers players
Ottawa Rough Riders players
Players of American football from Ohio
Living people
Players of Canadian football from Ohio